MOS or Mos may refer to:

Technology 
 MOSFET (metal–oxide–semiconductor field-effect transistor), also known as the MOS transistor
 Mathematical Optimization Society
 Model output statistics, a weather-forecasting technique
 MOS (filmmaking), term for a scene that is "motor only sync" or "motor only shot", or jokingly, “mit out sound”
 Mobile operating system, operating systems for mobile devices

Computing 
 Acorn MOS, an operating system used in the Acorn BBC computer range
 Media Object Server, a protocol used in newsroom computer systems
 Mean opinion score, a measure of the perceived quality of a signal
 MOS (operating system), a Soviet Unix clone
 My Oracle Support, a support site for the users of Oracle Corporation products, known until October 2010 as "MetaLink"
macOS, an operating system for Macs

Government and military 
 Master of the Sword, the title for the head of physical education at the U.S. Military Academy at West Point
 Member of Service, any emergency responder (police officer, firefighter, emergency medical technician) that needs emergency help, usually over two-way radio
 Military occupation specialty code, used by the U.S. military to identify a specific job
 Ministry of Supply, former British government ministry that co-ordinated military supplies

Places 
 Ma On Shan (town), a town in the New Territories of Hong Kong
 Ma On Shan station, MTR station code
 Mos, Spain, a municipality in Galicia, Spain in the province of Pontevedra
 Museum of Science (Boston) (MoS), a Boston, Massachusetts landmark, located in Science Park, a plot of land spanning the Charles River, USA

Companies and organizations 
 MOS (brand), American brand of organizational tools
 MOS Technology, a defunct semiconductor company
 Mos, a startup tech company founded by Amira Yahyaoui
 MOS Burger, a fast-food restaurant chain that originated in Japan
 The Mosaic Company (NYSE: MOS), American fertilizer and mining company

Other uses 
 Mos, an uncommon singular form of mores, widely observed social norms (from Latin  and )
 Mos, a traditional dish of the Nivkh people
 Mos language, an aboriginal Mon–Khmer language of Malaya and Thailand
 Mannan oligosaccharide-based nutritional supplements
 Manual of style, also known a style guide or stylebook; a guide for writing and sometimes also for layout and typography
 Margin on services, a financial reporting method for Australian life insurance companies
 Moment of symmetry, in music, same as well formed generated collection
 MOS (gene), gene for a human protein expressed in testis during sperm formation
 MOS, German vehicle registration plate district code for Neckar-Odenwald-Kreis
 "Man on the street" segments in broadcasting
 Mossi language ISO 639 alpha-2 language code
 Morvan Syndrome (MoS) though usually referred to as MVS
 MOS, minimum operating segment of a transportation system
 Mos, nickname of Thai singer Patiparn Patavekarn, also referred to as Mos Patiparn

See also

 Mo's Restaurants, American restaurant chain in Oregon
 Molybdenum disulfide (MoS2)
 Mos Def, American hip-hop artist and actor
 Mos Eisley, a fictional city which first appeared in Star Wars Episode 4: A New Hope
 PC-MOS/386
 Man of Steel (disambiguation)
 MDOS (disambiguation)